Oorai Therinjikitten is a 1988 Indian Tamil-language comedy film, written and directed by Kalaipuli G. Sekaran. The film stars Pandiarajan and Pallavi, with Jaishankar, Senthil and Kalaipuli G. Sekaran in supporting roles. It was released on 15 January 1988.

Plot

Cast 

 Pandiarajan as Pandiyan / Rajan
 Pallavi as Geetha
Sunitha
 Jaishankar as Geetha's father
 Senthil as Rajan's friend
 Kalaipuli G. Sekaran as Nayagam
 Malaysia Vasudevan as Yercud subbramani
 Loose Mohan as Fake saint
 Thyagu as Principal
 S. S. Chandran as Lawyer
 Kumarimuthu as Lunatic person
 Joker Thulasi as Lunatic
 Charle as Reporter
 Chinni Jayanth as Uttalakkadi Ulaganathan
 T. K. S. Natarajan as Peon
 Peeli Sivam as Muthu
 Thideer Kannaiah as Doctor
 King Kong as Kuttaiyan
'Bayilvan' Ranganathan as Auctioneer
 Oru Viral Krishna Rao as Patient
 Omakkuchi Narasimman as Lunatic person
 Kishmu as Ice mama

Soundtrack 
All songs were written by Vaali and composed by Gangai Amaran.

Reception 
Jayamanmadhan of Kalki criticised many of the comedy sequences for lacking relevance to the story, but noted that they would make children of all ages laugh.

References

External links 

1980s Tamil-language films
1988 comedy films
1988 films
Films scored by Gangai Amaran
Indian comedy films